Peer Gynt is a play by Henrik Ibsen named for its main character, based on the fairy tale Per Gynt.

Peer Gynt may also refer to:
 Peer Gynt (Grieg), incidental music to Ibsen's play by Edvard Grieg, commonly performed in two concert suites
 Peer Gynt (1998 adaptation), by David Henry Hwang and Stephan Muller
 Peer Gynt (opera), a 1938 opera by Werner Egk
 Peer Gynt, a ballet by John Neumeier set to music by Alfred Schnittke
 Peer Gynt Sculpture Park, in Oslo, Norway
 Peer Gynt (mountainroad), a tourist mountain road in Norway
 Peer Gynt Prize, an annual award since 1971
 Peer Gynt (1915 film), a 1915 American fantasy silent film
 Peer Gynt (1918 film)
 Peer Gynt (1919 film), a 1919 German silent film
 Peer Gynt (1934 film), a 1934 German drama film
 Peer Gynt (1941 film)

See also
 Per Gynt, the fairy tale upon which the play Peer Gynt is based
 Peer Günt, a Finnish hard rock band